Calyptoglossa frontalis is a species of beetle in the family Cicindelidae, the only species in the genus Calyptoglossa.

References

Cicindelidae
Beetles described in 1839
Beetles described in 1946